Hromivka is a place name in Ukraine which can refer to the following villages:
 Hromivka, Crimea
 Hromivka, Kherson Oblast
 Hromivka, Khmelnytskyi Oblast
 Hromivka, Zaporizhia Oblast